The Roman Catholic Church in New Zealand is composed of one ecclesiastical province with 5 suffragan dioceses.

Episcopal Conference of New Zealand

Ecclesiastical Province of Wellington
Archdiocese of Wellington
Diocese of Auckland
Diocese of Christchurch
Diocese of Dunedin
Diocese of Hamilton in New Zealand
Diocese of Palmerston North

External links
 http://www.catholic-hierarchy.org/country/dnz2.html

New Zealand
Catholic dioceses